A buddle pit or buddle pond is a pit, often circular when specifically constructed, the purpose of which was to separate by sedimentation minerals from lighter rock dust in crushed ore, and used in the mineral mining industry (such as in extracting tin, lead and zinc).  Many of the relics seen today date from Victorian times.

Early examples of buddle pits were often natural hollows in the ground, adapted by lining them with stone or clay to make them waterproof.

A purpose-built pit, constructed from stone or brick, cement and mortar, contained water, and a set of brushes, often powered by a water wheel, which rotated in the water in order to agitate the mixture, the result of which was that the heavier and denser material - i.e. the ore - tended to collect at the centre of the pit, from where it could be retrieved. The worthless gangue was then disposed of, often by draining.

Usually a set of buddle pits was utilised, with the richer central deposits in the pit being carried to another buddle, where they were treated in the same manner, and so on.

Whilst the round buddle pit was the most common, there was a variation called the concave buddle, which had a concave bottom.

The following detailed extract comes from Machinery for Metalliferous Mines: A practical treatise for mining engineers, metallurgists and managers of mines, by E. Henry Davies, C. Lockwood and son, 1902 :

See also
 Buddle pits in Dartmoor
 Metal mining
 Metal mining in Wales
 Adelong Falls Gold Workings (Australia)

References

Mining techniques
History of mining